Cloud House Farm or Finca Casa Nube rests within the Municipal of Genalguacil (Andalucia, Spain) in the foothills of the Sierra Bermeja.
The historic farm is at the centre of locality called Benestepar which dates back to the Moorish conquest.

The farm was abandoned for 20–30 years and is currently undergoing restoration.

Location
Benestepar was once a village and center of activity. Climate change and water shortage forced many residents to relocate to the villages Benarraba and Genalguacil.

The importance of the area in historic times is seen in a Roman Bridge constructed close to the farm, now in ruins, but with one half of a magnificent still arch intact. The purpose of this bridge is a subject of ongoing debate, whether it was built to serve as a direct passage between Genalguacil and Casares, or to serve a large mill close to the footing of the bridge.

Its located at 450m (N 36.540484,  W -5.249593) in the foothills of the largest peak in the area Los Reales, along several historical walks, notably The Walk of the Vizir's Garden documented by Guy Hunter Watts which takes walkers past the Roman Ruin and on past Cloud House Farm, linking the 2 villages Genalguacil and Benestepar. It is common to be surrounded by clouds as its name sake refers.

Farm
Cloud House Farm has a notable ruin dating back 300+ years located at the Rio Almarchal river. An old Aguardiente Mill which still has the cut out for the kettle intact.
Also on the site is an old Bodega which up until the 1970s was used for pressing locally grown grapes for the domestic production of Mosto wine.

The farm or Finca has had various names through the ages, commonly referred to as Finca Benestepar, Finca Los Cernicalos or Finca Casa Nube, which denotes its current English translation Cloud House Farm.

Province of Málaga
Buildings and structures in Andalusia